"Honored Art Worker" is one of state honorary titles of Azerbaijan, awarded by the Decree of the President of the Republic of Azerbaijan based on approval of the Regulations on Honorary Titles of the Republic of Azerbaijan.

Canditions 
The honorary title "Honored Art Worker" is awarded to outstanding composers, directors, conductors, playwrights, screenwriters, filmmakers, art critics and literary critics, who create scientific and dramaturgical works on field of art, as well as performances, films, and art.

The Honorary Title Certificate and its badge are presented in the ceremonial and public place by the President of Azerbaijan. Citizens who are awarded honorary titles of the Republic of Azerbaijan wear the badge on the left chest. This honorary title is given to citizens of Azerbaijan as well as foreigners. They have to have worked in this field at least 20 years. It is not given to a person for the second time.

A person awarded the honorary title may be deprived of the honorary title in the case of:

 conviction for a serious crime;
 committing an offense that tarnished the honorary title

List of Honored Art Workers of Azerbaijan 

 Hidayat Orujov
 Manaf Suleymanov
 Elza Ibrahimova
 Natig Rasulzadeh
 Vidadi Muradov
 Rauf Adigozalov

See also 

 Heydar Aliyev Prize
 Heydar Aliyev Order

References 

Awards established in 1998
Honorary titles of Azerbaijan
1998 establishments in Azerbaijan